Gabriel Lopes (born 2 December 1931) is a Portuguese former sailor. He competed in the Flying Dutchman event at the 1960 Summer Olympics.

References

External links
 

1931 births
Possibly living people
Portuguese male sailors (sport)
Olympic sailors of Portugal
Sailors at the 1960 Summer Olympics – Flying Dutchman
Sportspeople from Setúbal